The Sri Venkateswara Temple is a Hindu temple located in Bridgewater, New Jersey. In 1998, the traditional stone temple was inaugurated. The temple is 11,000 square feet.

History 
In 1989, a group of practicing Hindus in areas surrounding New Jersey established the Hindu Temple and Cultural Society of USA Inc. (HTCS). In February 1992, the HTCS purchased land in Bridgewater, New Jersey in hopes of building a traditional stone temple. Devotees began engaging in regularly scheduled spiritual activities and worship in the building previously built on the purchased land, as the planning for a new temple continued. In 1995, the ground breaking ceremony of the new temple was performed. In May 1996, a stone laying ceremony was conducted by Chinna Jeeyar Swami and the temple construction began according to the Vastu Shastras. In 1998, consecration ceremony was conducted by Chinna Jeeyar Swami and other priests and the temple was inaugurated.

In 2019, the Bridgewater zoning board approved the temples plan for expanding facilities.

Deities 
There are 16 shrines within the temple which include sacred images of Venkateswara, Sridevi, Bhudevi, Garuda, Ganesha, Ambika, Nandi, Siva Lingam, Ayyappa, Subrahmanya, Satyanarayana, Durga, Saraswati, Lakshmi Narayan, Radha Krishna, Rama, Anjaneya, and Navagraha.

References

Hindu temples in New Jersey
Religious buildings and structures
Indian-American culture in New Jersey
Hindu temples
Bridgewater Township, New Jersey
1998 establishments in New Jersey